Pablo Andrés Alarcón Cares (born 15 May 1988) is a Chilean cyclist, who currently rides for UCI Continental team .

Major results

2012
 2nd Road race, National Road Championships
 9th Overall Vuelta Ciclista de Chile
2014
 2nd Road race, National Road Championships
2016
 1st Gran Premio de San José
2018
 5th Overall Vuelta a Costa Rica
 6th Gran Premio FECOCI
 7th Gran Premio Comite Olímpico Nacional
 South American Games
8th Road race
10th Time trial
2019
 1st Stage 3b Tour de Beauce
 2nd Overall Vuelta Ciclista a Chiloé
1st Points classification
1st Stage 3
 8th Overall Joe Martin Stage Race
 10th Overall Vuelta a Costa Rica
1st Stage 10
2020
 3rd Gran Premio de la Patagonia

References

External links
 

1988 births
Living people
Chilean male cyclists
Cyclists at the 2019 Pan American Games
Pan American Games competitors for Chile
People from Osorno, Chile